F. gracilis may refer to:
 Farlowella gracilis, a catfish species
 Ferocactus gracilis, a cactus species
 Ficus gracilis, a sea snail species
 Fluviopupa gracilis, a gastropod species endemic to Australia
 Froelichia gracilis, a plant species in the genus Froelichia

See also
 Gracilis (disambiguation)